"Not Fade Away" is a song credited to Buddy Holly (originally under his first and middle names, Charles Hardin) and Norman Petty (although Petty's co-writing credit is likely to have been a formality) and first recorded by Holly and his band, the Crickets.

Original song
Holly and the Crickets recorded the song in Clovis, New Mexico, on May 27, 1957, the same day the song "Everyday" was recorded. The rhythmic pattern of "Not Fade Away" is a variant of the Bo Diddley beat, with the second stress occurring on the second rather than third beat of the first measure, which was an update of the "hambone" rhythm, or patted juba from West Africa.  Jerry Allison, the drummer for the Crickets, pounded out the beat on a cardboard box. Allison, Holly's best friend, wrote some of the lyrics, though his name never appeared in the songwriting credits. Joe Mauldin played the double bass on this recording. It is likely that the backing vocalists were Holly, Allison, and Niki Sullivan, but this is not known for certain.

"Not Fade Away" was originally released as the B-side of the hit single "Oh, Boy!" and was included on the album The "Chirping" Crickets (1957). The Crickets' recording never charted as a single.

Personnel 
Buddy Holly and the Crickets
 Buddy Holly – lead vocals, lead guitar, backing vocals
 Jerry Allison – drums, card-box percussion
 Joe B. Mauldin – contrabass
 Niki Sullivan – rhythm guitar, backing vocals

The Rolling Stones version

In 1964, the Rolling Stones' cover of "Not Fade Away" was a major hit in the United Kingdom. It was the A-side of the band's first US single.

The Rolling Stones' version of "Not Fade Away" was one of their first hits. Recorded in January 1964 and released by Decca Records on February 21, 1964, with "Little by Little" as the B-side, it was their first Top 10 hit in the United Kingdom, reaching number three. London Records released the song in the US on March 6, 1964, as the band's first single there, with "I Wanna Be Your Man" as the B-side. The single reached number 48 on the U.S. Billboard Hot 100 singles chart. It also reached number 44 on the Cash Box pop singles chart in the U.S. and number 33 in Australia based on the Kent Music Report. "Not Fade Away" was not on the UK version of their debut album, The Rolling Stones, but was the opening track of the US version, released a month later as England's Newest Hitmakers.  Cash Box described it as "a wild, freewheeling full-sounding pounder that can take off in no time flat." It was a mainstay of the band's concerts in their early years, usually opening the shows. It was revived as the opening song in the band's Voodoo Lounge Tour, in 1994 and 1995.

Personnel 

According to authors Philippe Margotin and Jean-Michel Guesdon, except where noted:

 Mick Jagger double tracked lead vocal, hand claps, tambourine, maracas
 Keith Richards twelve-string acoustic guitar, lead guitar
 Brian Jones harmonica
 Bill Wyman bass
 Charlie Watts drums

Charts

Other cover versions 
The Grateful Dead's 1971 recording of the song is on their eponymous second live album, and it was often performed live.
Rush recorded a version of "Not Fade Away" as their debut single in 1973, which peaked at number 88 in Canada. The single was released on the band's own Moon Records label, and is considered a rare collector's item today, as it has never been reissued on any format.
Tanya Tucker included a funky, rock-and-roll version of "Not Fade Away" on her album, TNT (1978). Tucker's cover of this song peaked at number 70 on the U.S. Billboard pop singles chart in 1979.
John Scofield included the song in his 2022 solo album.

Explanatory notes

References

Sources

 
 
 

1957 songs
1957 singles
1964 singles
1973 singles
2007 singles
Buddy Holly songs
The Rolling Stones songs
Dick and Dee Dee songs
Decca Records singles
London Records singles
Grateful Dead songs
Sheryl Crow songs
Rush (band) songs
Songs written by Buddy Holly
Song recordings produced by Andrew Loog Oldham
Songs written by Norman Petty
Brunswick Records singles
The Crickets songs